Pedro Méndez (27 September 1904 – 19 February 1999) was a Spanish freestyle swimmer. He competed in three events at the 1924 Summer Olympics.

References

External links
 

1904 births
1999 deaths
Spanish male freestyle swimmers
Olympic swimmers of Spain
Swimmers at the 1924 Summer Olympics
Swimmers from Madrid